The Man with the Twisted Lip is a 1921 British short silent film directed by Maurice Elvey. It is the eighth film in Stoll's Adventures of Sherlock Holmes series starring Eille Norwood as the detective.

Plot summary 
Sherlock Holmes discovers that the case of the Mrs. Neville St. Clair's missing husband may be connected to a disfigured beggar from Piccadilly Circus, known as "the man with the twisted lip".

Cast 
Eille Norwood as Sherlock Holmes
Hubert Willis as Dr. John Watson
Robert Vallis as Neville St. Clair
Paulette del Baye as Mrs. Nellie St. Clair
Madame d'Esterre as Mrs. Hudson

See also
Sherlock Holmes (Stoll film series)

References

External links 

1921 films
British mystery films
1920s English-language films
British black-and-white films
British silent short films
1921 mystery films
1920s British films
Silent mystery films